George Thomas Kottukapally of  Pala, Kottayam, Kerala, India (29 October 1901 – 11 October 1970), was a Member of Parliament, philanthropist, one of South India's largest plantation owners, public intellectual, an Indian independence activist and a member of the Indian National Congress including having taken part in the Indian Independence Movement through the Non co-operation movement in 1921.  Post India's Independence in 1947, Kottukapally was elected as the Municipal Chairman, a position equivalent to that of a Mayor for the municipal township of Pala, Kottayam, Kerala which he held between 1948 and 1953. Further, he was elected as an Indian Member of Parliament representing the Indian National Congress party in the 1st Lok Sabha and the 2nd Lok Sabha from 1953 till 1962 for the erst-while constituency of Muvattupuzha (Lok Sabha constituency) which consisted of the whole of Idukki, parts of Kottayam, Pathanamthitta and Chalakudy. He was also India's representative to the United Nations in Prime Minister Jawaharlal Nehru's Delegation in 1958.

Family History
According to the local church's records and the family privately held manuscripts, the Kottukapally family's origin lies in the traditionally held belief in which their ancestry is traced to a Brahmin family "Kottakkavu" from 52 AD, wherein members of the family converted and become members of the Kottakkavu Mar Thoma Syro-Malabar Pilgrim Church, North Paravur, one among the seven Churches acknowledged as to be founded Thomas the Apostle, one of the Twelve Apostles of Jesus Christ. The family name "Kottukapally" is traced as a derivative from the Brahmin family name "Kottakkavu" given that members from the Kottakkavu Illam converted to Christianity from the evangelical activity undertaken by Thomas the Apostle. The Kottukapally family ties with the township of Pala, Kottayam started in the 18th century, with the family having moved to Pala, Kottayam to start the trading market in pepper under the invitation of the Kartha, a local chieftain equivalent to that of a Duke, of Meenachil. As historical evidence, the family still has a part of their 280-year-old famed ancestral home or known as the Kottukapally Tharavad currently under the custodianship of George Thomas Kottukapally's youngest son John Thomas Kottukapally  located in the heartland of Pala, Kottayam. Thereby, in founding a pepper trading market, the Kottukapally family is considered as one of the founding families of modern Pala, Kottayam, of what is known as 'Angadi' Pala, Kottayam. With this lineage, George Thomas Kottukapally's past, present and future were both inextricably linked such that his political, social and economic vision for Pala, Kottayam led him to be elected as the Chairman, a position equivalent to that of a Mayor, for the Municipality of Pala, Kottayam which he held between 1948 and 1953.

The Kottukapally family of Pala, Kottayam held a strong-hold in the political landscape of Pala, Kottayam wherein George Thomas Kottukapally's elder brother George Joseph Kottukapally was also an Indian independence activist and was twice elected as a Member of the Sree Moolam Popular Assembly, the equivalent of being a Member of Parliament in the erst-while Kingdom of Travancore under the Maharaja of Travancore. Post George Thomas Kottukapally's demise, the next generation continued with his eldest son Joseph Thomas Kottukapally having stepped into providing leadership to the township of Pala, Kottayam by being the Municipal Chairman of Pala, Kottayam, an elected position which he held onto for 16-years.

Social Contributions
George Thomas Kottukapally's contributions as one of Kerala's earliest and leading philanthropist, educationalist and a social contributor was highlighted by the former President of India A. P. J. Abdul Kalam in his speech while inaugurating the 62nd foundation day celebrations of St. Thomas College, Pala  as well as to mark the 111th birth anniversary. .  y of George Thomas Kottukappally in 2012 by stating "People of Kottayam are grateful to the gesture of 'Father' (being the financial sponsor and a co-founder) George Thomas Kottukapally in providing acres of land for the creation of this college in 1950s". George Thomas Kottukapally's family ancestry and lineage, being a son of an ancient and prominent Syro-Malabar Saint Thomas Christian aristocratic Kottukapally family of Pala, Kottayam had deeply influenced his life, leading him to be a prominent supporter and as a key financial benefactor of the Saint Thomas Christian Syro-Malabar Catholic Church in Pala, Kottayam and the State of Kerala. George Thomas Kottukapally's contributions in a personal capacity include having financially supported as well as in having provided the land for the establishment of the Bishop's House, Pala, later leading to the formal establishment of the Syro-Malabar Eparchy of Pala. He also provided his personal land as well as the financing for the establishment of a set of Kerala's well-known university-level colleges which include St. Thomas College, Pala founded in 1950, Alphonsa College, Pala founded in 1964 and St. Thomas Teacher's Training College, Pala founded in 1957.

According to K. P. S. Menon (senior), India's first foreign secretary under Prime Minister Jawaharlal Nehru, in a public foreword about Kottukapally's contributions, he acknowledged that Kottukapally as the Municipal Chairman from 1948 till 1953 was a 'key architect' and was one of the 'founding fathers' of the post-Independent Indian township of Pala, Kottayam stating that, "Not only Pala but all Kerala is indebted to Mr. Kottukapally for his services in the agricultural, industrial and banking fields. It was largely due to him and his tirelessly advocacy and his intercession with men at the top that the magnificent hydro-electric project in Idukki materialised". Currently, economic-wise, the township and the region of Pala, Kottayam is ranked as one of the richest and most prosperous Syro-Malabar Saint Thomas Christian belt in the State of Kerala.

Field of Banking
In the field of banking, George Thomas Kottukapally held the position of being the President of the important and powerful lobby group Travancore-Cochin Bankers Association and was one of the key promoters and a director of Palai Central Bank founded in 1927, then the  17th largest among the 94 scheduled banks in India at its peak in 1960. Palai Central Bank was also Kerala's largest and most important private enterprise  after the State Government of Kerala. But, in 1960, the Kerala High Court ordered the liquidation of Palai Central Bank on a petition from the Reserve Bank of India. That having said, in Volume II of the History of Reserve Bank of India covering the years 1951–1967, a 27-page appendix viz. "Appendix C: The Palai Central Bank" extensively covers the history of the Bank. The following is an extract: "While defending the Reserve Bank as 'one of the best central banks in the world' maintaining a 'high level of efficiency', the Prime Minister of India Jawaharlal Nehru, was reported to have acknowledged that it may have made a 'mistake' in closing down the Palai Central Bank." In the field of commerce, industry and trade, George

Planter and Agriculturist
Thomas Kottukapally was one of South India's leading agriculture plantation owner-cum-investor-cum-industrialist having been the Managing Director and director of several cross-holding businesses, planting and banking companies such as Teekoy Rubbers (India) Ltd, Karikode Rubbers (1945) Ltd, Periyar & and Pareekanni Rubber Limited.

Historically, the Kottukapally family is recorded as one of the largest land-holding families in the State of Kerala while, currently, George Thomas Kottukapally though deceased, still continues to be ranked historically as one of the largest Christian landowners in the Indian sub-continent. Post his demise, the State Government of Kerala, India had appropriated a large part of his estates and land bank on the basis of surplus land of which included the Cheemeni Village in the district of Kasargod, Kerala, India.

References

Lok Sabha members from Kerala
1901 births
1970 deaths
People from Pala, Kerala
Indian National Congress politicians from Kerala
Indian independence activists from Kerala
India MPs 1957–1962
India MPs 1952–1957